The Juno Awards of 1994, representing Canadian music industry achievements of the previous year, were awarded on 20 March 1994 in Toronto at a ceremony in the O'Keefe Centre. Roch Voisine was the host for the ceremonies, which were taped that afternoon for broadcast that evening on CBC Television.

Nominations were announced 8 February 1994. Starting in 1994, the Best New Solo Artist combined the former Most Promising Male and Female Vocalist categories. Reggae also received its own category, after years of being included under banners such as "world beat" or mixed with calypso.

A new category for aboriginal music was also introduced and was awarded by Robbie Robertson. The award faced controversy after nominee Sazacha Red Sky was accused of cultural appropriation by Leonard George son of Chief Dan George, the alleged writer of the song that has since been registered as Public Domain, because she was not personally a member of the Tsleil-Waututh First Nation and according to Leonard George did not have the right to record it under their cultural traditions. His son Leonard George sought a legal injunction to prevent the award from being presented at the Juno Awards ceremony at all, and a final compromise revising Red Sky's nomination to reflect the album instead of the song was announced on the morning of the ceremony.

Around the time of the 1994 ceremonies, there were plans to host the 1995 ceremonies in Winnipeg. However, Juno organisers CARAS was demanding substantial funding from the Winnipeg committee attempting to host the awards.

Atlantic group The Rankin Family was the major winner in 1994, winning awards in four categories including Entertainer of the Year.

Nominees and winners

Canadian Entertainer of the Year
This award was chosen by a national poll rather than by Juno organisers CARAS.

Winner: The Rankin Family

Other Nominees:
 Barenaked Ladies
 Celine Dion
 The Tragically Hip
 Michelle Wright

Best Female Vocalist
Winner: Celine Dion

Other Nominees:
 Rita MacNeil
 Sarah McLachlan
 Anne Murray
 Alannah Myles

Best Male Vocalist
Winner: Roch Voisine

Other Nominees:
 Stef Carse
 Daniel Lanois
 John McDermott
 Snow

Best New Solo Artist
Winner: Jann Arden

Other Nominees:
 Meryn Cadell
 Charlie Major
 Mario Pelchat
 Jim Witter

Group of the Year
Winner: The Rankin Family

Other Nominees:
 Blue Rodeo
 The Jeff Healey Band
 Moxy Früvous
 Rush

Best New Group
Winner: The Waltons

Other Nominees:
 Junkhouse
 The Odds
 Sloan
 The Tea Party

Songwriter of the Year
Winner: Leonard Cohen

Other Nominees:
 Jann Arden
 Jim Cuddy and Greg Keelor
 Sarah McLachlan
 Jane Siberry

Best Country Female Vocalist
Winner: Cassandra Vasik

Other Nominees:
 Joan Kennedy
 Anne Murray
 Anita Perras
 Shania Twain

Best Country Male Vocalist
Winner: Charlie Major

Other Nominees:
 Joel Feeney
 George Fox
 Ron Hynes
 Jim Witter

Best Country Group or Duo
Winner: The Rankin Family

Other Nominees:
 The Blue Shadows
 Cassandra Vasik and Russell deCarle
 One Horse Blue
 The Johner Brothers

Best Instrumental Artist
Winner: Ofra Harnoy

Other Nominees:
 John Arpin
 André Gagnon
 Jacques de Kononck
 Shadowy Men on a Shadowy Planet

Best Producer
Winner: Steven MacKinnon and Marc Jordan, "Waiting for a Miracle" from Reckless Valentine by Marc Jordan

Other Nominees:
 k.d. lang and Ben Mink, "Just Keep Me Moving" by k.d. lang (from Even Cowgirls Get the Blues soundtrack)
 Daniel Lanois, "The Messenger" and "Mon beau petit choux" from For the Beauty of Wynona by Daniel Lanois
 Geddy Lee, Alex Lifeson and Neil Peart with co-producer Peter Collins, "Nobody's Hero" and "Alien Shore" from Counterparts by Rush
 Jane Siberry, "Temple" from When I Was a Boy by Jane Siberry

Best Recording Engineer
Winner: Kevin Doyle, "Old Cape Cod" and "Cry Me a River" by Anne Murray

Other Nominees:
 Marc Ramaer, "Just Keep Me Moving", "Even Cowgirls Get the Blues" by k.d. lang
 Andy Hermant, "Life on the Inside Track", "Sweet Airs That Give Delight", "When Daisies Pied", "Sweet Airs That Give Delight" by Stratford Orchestra
 Stephen Traub, "Window of Opportunity" from Bombazine by Meryn Cadell
 Michael Phillip Wojewoda, "Beginning of Time" and "Calling All Angels" by Jane Siberry

Canadian Music Hall of Fame
Winner: Rush

Walt Grealis Special Achievement Award
Winner: John V. Mills

Nominated and winning albums

Best Album
Winner: Harvest Moon, Neil Young

Other Nominees:
 The Future, Leonard Cohen
 I'll Always Be There, Roch Voisine
 Rocking Horse, Alannah Myles
 12 Inches of Snow, Snow

Best Children's Album
Winner: Tchaikovsky Discovers America, Susan Hammond, Classical Kids

Other Nominees:
 Candles, Snow and Mistletoe, Sharon, Lois and Bram
 The Child's Play Connection, Barbara Nichol and others
 Dream Catcher, Jack Grunsky
 Can't Sit Down, Eric Nagler

Best Classical Album (Solo or Chamber Ensemble)
Winner: Beethoven: Piano Sonatas, Opus 10, No 1-3, Louis Lortie

Other Nominees:
 Mozart: Two-Piano Sonata, Louis Lortie and Helene Mercier
 Romantic Works for Guitar, Norbert Kraft
 Schmelzer: Sonatas, Tafelmusik, director Jeanne Lamon
 Simphonies des noels: A Treasury of Baroque Christmas Concerti, Les Violins du Roy, directory Bernard Labadie

Best Classical Album (Large Ensemble)
Winner: Handel: Concerti Grossi, Op.3 No. 1-6, Tafelmusik, director Jeanne Lamon

Other Nominees:
 Barok: The Miraculous Mandarin, Orchestre symphonique de Montreal
 Gluck: Ballet Pantomimes, Tafelmusik
 Rachmaninoff: Piano Concerto No. 4, Arthur Ozolins, Toronto Symphony Orchestra
 Stravinsky, Szymanowski: Violin Concertos, Chantal Juillet and Orchestre symphonique de Montreal

Best Classical Album (Vocal or Choral Performance)
Winner: Debussy Songs, soprano Claudette Leblanc, piano Valerie Tryon

Other Nominees:
 Elektra Women's Choir, Elektra Women's Choir
 Full Well She Sang, The Toronto Consort
 Schubert: Lieder, soprano Edith Wiens, piano Rudolf Jansen, clarinet Joaquin Valdepenas
 Venetian Vespers of 1640, Vancouver Cantata Singers, director James Fankhauser

Best Album Design
Winner: Marty Dolan, Faithlift by Spirit of the West

Other Nominees:
 Kenny Baird, 5 Days in July by Blue Rodeo
 Patrick Duffy and Steve Cole, Splendor Solis by The Tea Party
 David Houghton - Pale Sun, Crescent Moon by Cowboy Junkies
 Kevin Mutch, God Shuffled His Feet by Crash Test Dummies

Best Selling Album (Foreign or Domestic)
Winner: The Bodyguard, Whitney Houston

Other Nominees:
 Bat Out of Hell II: Back into Hell, Meat Loaf
 Fully Completely, The Tragically Hip
 Get a Grip, Aerosmith
 Keep the Faith, Bon Jovi

Best Mainstream Jazz Album
Winner: Fables and Dreams, Dave Young/Phil Dwyer Quartet

Other Nominees:
 Just BB, Oliver Jones
 Our 25th Year, Rob McConnell and the Boss Brass
 Standard Idioms, Sonny Greenwich
 Wheel Within a Wheel, Bernie Senensky

Best Blues/Gospel Album
Winner: South at Eight/North at Nine, Colin Linden

Other Nominees:
 Bluesology, Whiteley Brothers
 Colin James and the Little Big Band, Colin James
 Terra Firma Boogie, Triple Threat
 You Can't Have Everything, Dutch Mason

Best Contemporary Jazz Album
Winner: Don't Smoke in Bed, Holly Cole Trio

Other Nominees:
 Face the Music, Garbo's Hat
 Michael Farquharson, Michael Farquharson
 Notorious, Five After Four, with Vito Razza
 The Standard Line, David Mott

Best Selling Francophone Album
Winner: Album de Peuple Tome 2, Francois Perusse

Other Nominees:
 Ca Va Bien, Kathleen Sergerie
 Corridors, Laurence Jalbert
 Europe Tour, Roch Voisine
 Pelchat, Mario Pelchat

Hard Rock Album of the Year
Winner: Dig, I Mother Earth

Other Nominees:
 Counterparts, Rush
 Crush, Doughboys
 Givin Blood, Wild T and the Spirit
 Splendor Solis, The Tea Party

Best Roots & Traditional Album
Winner: My Skies, James Keelaghan

Other Nominees:
 At a High Window, Garnet Rogers
 Christmas, Bruce Cockburn
 Home in Halifax, Stan Rogers
 Jigzup, Oliver Schroer

Nominated and winning releases

Single of the Year
Winner: "Fare Thee Well Love", The Rankin Family

Other Nominees:
 "Courage", The Tragically Hip
 "Harvest Moon", Neil Young
 "He Would Be Sixteen", Michelle Wright
 "Love Can Move Mountains", Celine Dion

Best Classical Composition
Winner: "Among Friends", Chan Ka Nin

Other Nominees:
 "Divertimento for Harp and Strings", Milton Barnes
 "Piano Concerto", Malcolm Forsyth
 "Sleight of Hand", Jean Piché
 "Three Poems", Peter Tiefenbach

Best Rap Recording
Winner: "One Track Mind", TBTBT

Other Nominees:
 "Got to Get Over", B-Kool
 "Call the Cops", Devon
 "Safe", Rumble
 "Try and Stop Us", Split Personality

Best R&B/Soul Recording
Winner: "The Time Is Right (I'll Be There for You)", Rupert Gayle

Other Nominees:
 "All I Need", George St. Kitts
 "And the Song Goes", Carol Medina
 "Love Me Right", MCJ and Cool G
 "Mothers of Hope", John James

Best Music of Aboriginal Canada Recording
Winner: Wapistan Is Lawrence Martin, Wapistan

Other Nominees:
 "Booglatamooti (The Indian Song)", J. Hubert Francis and Eagle Feather
 "Grandfather", J. Hubert Francis and Eagle Feather
 "Stoney Park", Stoney Park Singers
 "The Prayer Song" (revised to Red Sky Rising), Sazacha Red Sky

Best Reggae Recording
Winner: "Informer", Snow

Other Nominees:
 "Child Support", Inspector Lenny
 "Love and Affection", Tanya Mullings
 "Save the Children", Leejahn
 "Secret Admirer", D.J. Ray

Best Global Recording
Winner: "El Camino Real", Ancient Cultures

Other Nominees:
 "Agada: Tales from Our Ancestors", Flying Bulgar Klezmer Band
 "Condor Meets the Eagle", Kanatan Aski with Pura Fé
 "Crossing Selkirk Avenue", Finjan
 "Enat", Mother Tongue

Best Dance Recording
Winner: "Thankful (Raw Club Mix)", Red Light

Other Nominees:
 "Don't Make Me Wait", Oval Emotion
 "I'm in Love with You", BKS
 "R U Sexin' Me", West End Girls
 "Won't Give Up My Music", Lisa Lougheed

Best Video
Winner: Jeth Weinrich, Jann Arden, "I Would Die For You"

Other Nominees:
 Don Allan, "Rain Down on Me" by Blue Rodeo
 Dale Heslip, "Mmm Mmm Mmm Mmm" by Crash Test Dummies
 Curtis Wehrfriz, "The Future" by Leonard Cohen
 Curtis Wehrfritz, "I Can See Clearly Now" by Holly Cole Trio

References

External links
Juno Awards site

1994
1994 music awards
1994 in Canadian music